Kerolite or cerolite is a metamorphic nickel bearing phyllosilicate mineral variety of talc, can be seen as a mixture of serpentine and saponite as well. It has the chemical formula . It is often considered as a talc variety and it was discredited 1979.

References
Mindat with location data
Webmineral - talc variety

Phyllosilicates